The North Coast 500 is a  scenic route around the north coast of Scotland, starting and ending at Inverness Castle. The route is also known as the NC500 and was launched in 2015, linking many features in the north Highlands of Scotland in one touring route.

The route has increased visitor numbers to parts of the north of Scotland, which has brought economic benefits to some areas. The increase in traffic has also led to more instances of bad and dangerous driving, as well as damage to the roads and concerns about the environmental impact.

Route

The route runs through the traditional counties of Inverness-shire, Ross and Cromarty, Sutherland and Caithness.

Working clockwise, the route starts at Inverness and runs via Muir of Ord, Applecross (including the Bealach na Bà), Gairloch, Ullapool, Scourie, Durness, Castle of Mey, Thurso, John o' Groats, Wick, Dunrobin Castle, Dingwall then back to Muir of Ord and Inverness. The route of the North Coast 500 takes in many areas of the North Highland Way, a walking route along Scotland's North Coast.

History
The North Coast 500 was launched in March 2015 by the Tourism Project Board of the North Highland Initiative (NHI), in an attempt to work with all aspects of the tourism sector to bring unified benefits to businesses across the route. It was identified that a gap existed in the market within the North Highlands for a tourism offering that included each county of the area (Caithness, Sutherland & Ross-shire) and that the North Coast 500 would address that. The initiative was supported by Visit Scotland and Highlands & Islands Enterprise (HIE).

In 2015, the route was named fifth in the "Top 5 Coastal Routes in the World" listing by Now Travel Magazine. It has been described as "Scotland's Route 66".

The NC500 is also regarded as a challenge for endurance cyclists. In August 2015, adventure cyclist Mark Beaumont established the record for the 516 mile route, completing it in 37 hours and 58 minutes. On 18 June 2016, former pro cyclist and Commonwealth Games medallist James McCallum completed the ride in 31 hours 23 minutes, holding the record until September 19, 2020, when Josh Quigley completed it in 31 hours 19 minutes and 8 seconds.

On June 4, 2021, endurance cyclist and Durness native Robbie Mitchell comprehensively beat the record to take the time down to 29 hours, 5 minutes and 42 seconds.

Impact and response
A survey commissioned by HIE suggested that the NC500 led to 29,000 more people visiting the area in its first year, who collectively spent £9 million. Much of the economic benefit may have gone to the larger towns, rather than the smaller settlements on the route. A Highland councillor commented in 2019 that visitors tended to stay in the area for only one night when using the route, in contrast with stays of several nights before it opened. In 2017, writer and broadcaster Cameron McNeish questioned the promotion of the route, given that the Scottish Government had adopted strong positions on climate change and renewable energy: "Should we really be promoting the idea of people driving petrol and diesel fuelled vehicles for 500 miles around the north of Scotland?"

The increase in traffic has led to problems on local roads – drivers not using passing places to allow others to overtake, groups driving in convoys, damaged roads, speeding and excessively slow driving blocking others. On four occasions in 2018, tacks had been scattered across the road, although the motive was never established. Some drivers have boasted of completing the route in under 24 hours and some locals have renamed it the Indy 500, after the US car race, because of some drivers' behaviour. Journey times for locals are up to three times longer during the peak driving season than at quieter times. During 2016 – the first full year of its operation – the number of deaths and serious accidents on the main roads forming the route increased by 45% compared with 2014. In 2021, reports of dirty camping and strained local infrastructure led to suggestions that the route had become a victim of its own success.

The route's popularity led to the launch of a similar but shorter route through the Central Highlands and Perthshire, the Heart 200.

References

Scenic routes in the United Kingdom
2015 establishments in Scotland
Highlands and Islands of Scotland
Inverness-shire
Ross and Cromarty
Sutherland
Caithness